Reginald Pryce Michell (9 April 1873 in Penzance – 19 May 1938 in Kingston-upon-Thames) was an English chess master.

He was British Amateur Champion in 1902. He played in eight England vs. USA cable matches between 1901 and 1911, and twice represented England in the 1st Chess Olympiad at London 1927 and the 5th Chess Olympiad at Folkestone 1933.
 
Michell was a frequent competitor in the Hastings International Chess Congress over 20 years, defeating Mir Sultan Khan and Vera Menchik in 1932/3. He finished 2nd, 3rd and 4th in the British Championship proper, defeating Henry Ernest Atkins on several occasions.

He worked in the Admiralty, and his wife Edith Michell (née Tapsell) was British Women's Champion in 1931 (jointly), 1932 and 1935.

References

External links

1873 births
1938 deaths
English chess players
Chess Olympiad competitors
Sportspeople from Penzance